Nogometni Klub Olimp Celje, commonly referred to as NK Olimp or simply Olimp, was a Slovenian football club from Celje. The club was founded in 1928. Their home ground still exists and is used as a training facility for NK Celje.

Association football clubs established in 1928
1928 establishments in Slovenia
Association football clubs disestablished in 1989
1989 disestablishments in Slovenia
Defunct football clubs in Slovenia
Football clubs in Yugoslavia
Sport in Celje